The foreign relations of Libya were largely reset at the end of the Libyan Civil War, with the overthrow of Muammar Gaddafi and the Second Libyan Civil War. The current Minister of Foreign Affairs since 15 March 2021 is Najla Mangoush. Although many foreign embassies in Tripoli closed down in 2014 due to the fighting, by the end of 2017 thirty diplomatic missions were reopened in the Libyan capital.

Foreign policy
In its 5 March 2011 "Founding Statement", the council stated, "[We] request from the international community to fulfill its obligations to protect the Libyan people from any further genocide and crimes against humanity without any direct military intervention on Libyan soil." Ali Al-Issawi was designated the Council's foreign affairs spokesperson in March 2011. Mahmoud Jibril later replaced Ali Al-Issawi and was designated as the Head of International Affairs.

The NTC has also called on the international community to render assistance to its efforts to dislodge Colonel Muammar Gaddafi, the ruler of Libya since 1969, and his loyalists. Officials have asked for medical supplies, money, and weapons, among other forms of foreign aid. In late June 2011, it proposed using internationally based frozen assets belonging to Gaddafi and his inner circle as collateral for loans, with Finance Minister Ali Tarhouni warning that his government is virtually out of money. The NTC has previously asked for those assets to be unfrozen and transferred to Benghazi, a request officials of the Obama administration in the United States indicated they would try to fulfill.

NTC officials have said that they intend to reward countries that have been early to recognise the council as the legitimate representative of Libya, as well as countries that have been involved in the international military intervention to suppress Gaddafi's forces. Among the incentives the council has offered to these countries, which it considers to be allies, are favorable oil contracts and other economic ties. On 15 July 2011, a council spokesman told members of the Libya Contact Group meeting in Istanbul, Turkey, that his government would not forge any new oil contracts and that an elected government must be in place before new deals could be made.

After anti-Gaddafi forces stormed Tripoli, the Libyan capital city, the information manager at NTC-run oil firm AGOCO said on 22 August that once Libya resumed oil exports, its new government "may have some political issues with Russia, China and Brazil" and favor Western and Arab countries that supported the uprising against Gaddafi when awarding oil contracts. However, on 23 August, Brazilian Foreign Minister Antonio Patriota said his government had been assured that if the NTC took power in Libya, "contracts will be respected" and Brazil would not be punished for its stance. On 1 September, an NTC representative in Paris claimed that the new Libyan government would not award oil contracts based on politics, though he said that a number of Western companies, including BP, Total, Eni, and "major American companies", had a particularly "good track record in the Libyan oil sector".

Foreign policy history 

The foreign relations of the Libya under Muammar Gaddafi (1969–2011) underwent much fluctuation and change. They were marked by severe tension with the West and by other national policies in the Middle East and Africa, including the Libyan government's financial and military support for numerous paramilitary and rebel groups.

Bilateral relations

Africa

Americas

Asia

Europe

Oceania

International response

During the Libyan Civil War, at least 100 countries and numerous international organisations, including the United Nations, expressly recognised the NTC as Libya's legitimate authority or used similar language. Several other countries have recognised the NTC as the interim government of Libya since the war's end.

Membership in intergovernmental organisations
Libya was suspended from Arab League proceedings in late February 2011 over the bombardment of civilians by Gaddafi's forces during widespread protests against his government. In early June, Vice Chairman Abdul Hafiz Ghoga, a frequent spokesman for the council, emphasised his government's intention to reintegrate Libya into the Arab world. It was reinstated on 27 August with the NTC as its representative.

The African Union's Peace and Security Council decided on 26 August 2011 to call for a national unity government including the remnants of the Gaddafi government as well as members of the NTC instead of transferring its diplomatic recognition to the NTC as Libya's legal representative. After Chairman Mustafa Abdul Jalil pledged the council's commitment to protecting human rights, shepherding Libya through the process of postwar reconciliation, and transitioning to full democracy at a Libya Contact Group conference in Paris on 1 September, a spokesman for the African Union Commission said the commission was "reassured" and would bring the issue of recognition up for discussion again. Relations between the AU and the NTC have been strained by persistent reports of hate crimes, including arbitrary detentions and lynchings, being perpetrated against black people in Tawergha, Tripoli, and other places in Libya.  On 20 September 2011, the African Union officially recognised the National Transitional Council as the legitimate representative of Libya.

The NTC asked to take up Libya's seat at the United Nations. The UN was also a member of the Libya Contact Group. Secretary-General Ban Ki-moon, the UN's nominal leader, said on 1 September that the UN would work with "Libyan authority" to help Libya transition toward democracy. Ban also backed a proposed United Nations Security Council resolution to codify the international body's role in supporting Libyan democracy and stability. Although the NTC welcomed United Nations Security Council Resolution 1973, which authorised the NATO-led bombing of Libyan military targets, it has rejected proposals for a United Nations peacekeeping contingent in postwar Libya, saying it wants no foreign troops deployed on Libyan soil. The United Nations General Assembly, with 114 member states in favor to 17 opposed, voted on 16 September 2011 to recognise the NTC as holding Libya's seat at the United Nations.

NTC appointed representatives during the civil war

The National Transitional Council had opened representative missions abroad during the civil war. Several countries had recognised the council as the sole "governing authority" in Libya and some of these countries invited the council to appoint diplomatic envoys and to take over Libyan embassies in their capitals. A number of embassies and diplomatic offices in other countries have declared allegiance to the council unilaterally, but it is unclear whether they are in communication with it.

Representative missions of the NTC during the civil war:

Sofia – Isse Rabii Anshour (ambassador)

Ottawa – Abubaker Karmos (interim chargé d'affaires)

Copenhagen – Ibrahim Grada (representative of NTC in Denmark)

Brussels – Mohamed Farhat (ambassador)

Paris – Mansour Seif Al-Nasr (special envoy)

Rome – Hafed Gaddur (ambassador)

Panama – Nagi Ahmed Ksuda (interim chargé d'affaires)

Seoul – Otman S. Saad AHBARA (ambassador) 

Bern – Sliman Bouchuiguir (ambassador)

Abu Dhabi – Dr Aref Ali Nayed (ambassador)

London – Mahmud al-Naku (chargé d'affaires)

Washington, D.C. – Ali Aujali (ambassador)

New York City – Abdel Rahman Shalgham (special representative)

See also
List of Ministers of foreign affairs of Libya
List of diplomatic missions in Libya
List of diplomatic missions of Libya
Libyan Civil War
2011 military intervention in Libya
Arab Spring
Foreign relations of Libya under Gaddafi
International reactions to the 2011 Libyan civil war
Libya Contact Group
London Conference on Libya
National Transitional Council

References

External links
Libya, the U.S., and the USSR from the Dean Peter Krogh Foreign Affairs Digital Archives